Oberthueria jiatongae is a moth in the Endromidae family. It is found in China (Shaanxi, Jiangxi, Hubei, Sichuan, Hunan, Guangdong, Hainan).

Adults have a sandy yellow ground colour, with white or ash grey suffusion. The wing pattern is dark grey and the submarginal field of the forewings is covered with dark yellow-brown to chestnut scales. These scales are brighter dark yellow to ochre-yellow on the hindwings. Adults are on wing from late April to early September in one or two generations per year.

References

Moths described in 2013
Oberthueria (moth)
Moths of Asia